The 1971 Miami Dolphins season was the team's sixth, and second in the National Football League (NFL). The team improved on their 10–4 record from 1970 and finished at 10–3–1 to win the first of four consecutive AFC East titles. They opened the season with a tie at Denver, split the next two, then won eight consecutive to improve to 9–1–1.

The Dolphins won their first division title, finishing first in the AFC East, and then defeated the Kansas City Chiefs in the divisional round in a second overtime (the game is considered the longest in NFL history by time). They advanced to their first AFC championship game and shut out the defending Super Bowl champion Baltimore Colts 21–0. However, in Super Bowl VI, Miami was walloped 24–3 by the Dallas Cowboys. After losing that Super Bowl, the Dolphins did not lose another game until Week 2 of the 1973 season, going  overall in the next two seasons (1972, 1973), both ending with Super Bowl victories.

Offseason

NFL Draft

Personnel

Staff

Roster

Schedule

 Monday (November 29), Saturday (December 11)

Game summaries

Week 2

Standings

Postseason

Schedule

AFC Divisional Playoff 
Miami Dolphins 27 K.C. Chiefs 24 (20T)

AFC Championship Game 
Miami Dolphins 21 Baltimore Colts 0

Super Bowl VI 
Dallas Cowboys 24 Miami Dolphins 3

Scoring summary 
 Dallas Mike Clark, FG 14 yds (3–0)
 Dallas L.Alworth, 9 yd pass from Staubach (Mike Clark kick, 10–0)
 Miami Yepremian, FG 23 yds (10–3)
 Dallas Duane Thomas, 5 yd run (Mike Clark kick, 17–3)
 Dallas Mike Ditka, 4 yd pass from Staubach (Mike Clark kick, 3–24)

References

External links 
 1971 Miami Dolphins at Pro-Football-Reference.com

Miami
1971 in sports in Florida
Miami Dolphins seasons
AFC East championship seasons
American Football Conference championship seasons